Jakub Gronowski (born 8 April 1983) is a Polish former professional footballer who played as a forward.

Career
Gronowski started his career playing with Bałtyk Gdynia, with whom he made 62 appearances over three seasons. Gronowski joined Lechia Gdańsk for the 2003–04 season, making 20 appearances and scoring one goal for the club during this time as the club went on to win promotion from the IV liga. After spending the following season with Kaszuby Połchowo he again returned to Lechia Gdańsk, making eight appearances in the II liga, Poland's second division. These six months with Lechia would prove to be the highlight of Gronowski's career as he would go on to have short spells with teams playing in the lower divisions. After his second spell with Lechia he went on to play for Cartusia Kartuzy, Orkan Rumia twice, Gryf Wejherowo twice, Bytovia Bytów,  Powiśle Dzierzgoń, GKS Przodkowo, KP Starogard Gdański, Wda Lipusz, Tucholanka Tuchola, and Kolejarz Chojnice being his final club in 2020.

Personal life

Gronowski's grandfather is former Lechia Gdańsk and Poland international footballer Robert Gronowski. Through his grandfather he is related to Henryk Gronowski, Robert's brother, and was also a former Lechia Gdańsk and Poland international footballer. Through his grandmother, Robert's wife, he is related to former Lechia player and manager Leszek Goździk.

References

1983 births
Living people
Bałtyk Gdynia players
Lechia Gdańsk players
Cartusia Kartuzy players
Gryf Wejherowo players
Bytovia Bytów players
Polish footballers
Association football forwards
I liga players
III liga players
IV liga players